RAIKO (literally thunder drum) is a Japanese satellite which was built and operated by Tohoku and Wakayama Universities. A two-unit CubeSat, RAIKO was deployed from the International Space Station (ISS) on 4 October 2012, having been launched on 21 July 2012.

RAIKO was launched aboard the Kounotori 3 (HTV-3) spacecraft, atop an H-IIB launch vehicle flying from pad LC-Y2 of the Yoshinobu Launch Complex at the Tanegashima Space Center. The launch occurred at 02:06:18 UTC on 21 July 2012. Four other CubeSats were launched with RAIKO; WE WISH, FITSAT-1, TechEdSat-1 and F-1. The five CubeSats was delivered to the International Space Station for deployment. CubeSats were deployed from Japanese Experiment Module (JEM) Kibō via the J-SSOD system on 4 October 2012.

Named after a Japanese god of thunder, RAIKO is a  spacecraft, which was used for technology demonstration. It carries a camera with a fish-eye lens for Earth imaging, a prototype star tracker, a deployable membrane to slow the satellite, lowering its orbit, a photographic system to measure the satellite's movement relative to the International Space Station, and a Ku-band antenna for communications and Doppler ranging experiments.

WE WISH, RAIKO, FITSat 1, F-1, and TechEdSat-1 travelled to orbit aboard Kounotori 3 (HTV-3).

References

External links 

 Official web page 

Spacecraft launched in 2012
CubeSats
Student satellites
Satellites deployed from the International Space Station